Sherpa is a fabric with a pile on one side and flat on the other side.

Structure 
Sherpa is a curly piled fabric structure made of synthetic yarns like acrylic or polyester. The texture is soft and fluffy, useful in jackets resembling wool or sheepskin on the piled side. Sherpa fleece is a knitted type of fabric usable in line clothing and winter wear.

History 
It was Collins & Aikman (An American manufacturer of decorative fabrics and automotive supplies) who first developed this fabric. Sherpa was the registered trademark of the company.

Use 
Mainly it is used in the lining of coats and for men's and children's jackets.

See also 

 Polar fleece

References 

Textiles